Flavobacterium psychrophilum is a psychrophilic, gram-negative bacterial rod (3-5 µm in length), belonging to the Bacteroidota. It is the causative agent of bacterial coldwater disease (BCWD) and was first isolated in 1948 during a die-off in the salmonid Oncorhychus kisutch.

Characteristics
Flavobacterium psychrophilum is a gram-negative bacteria ranging in size of 0.75-1.0 µm wide by 3-5 µm long. It is found in cold, fresh waters with an optimal growth temperature below 16C.  When grown on Cytophaga Agar, F. psychrophilum produces bright yellow colonies with thin spreading margins not greater than 3mm in diameter.  Motility is achieved by gliding, movement that does not involve the use of pili or flagella.  The bacterium is positive for gelatin hydrolysis, albumin digestion, tributyrin digestion, tributyrin hydrolysis, E.coli cell autolysis, and casein hydrolysis. On its fish host, the pathogen can be found on external and internal sites such as skin/mucus, gills, brain, ascites, lesions, mucus, kidney, spleen, and reproductive excretions of spawning adults.  Colonization is evident by faint, white areas on the host.

Metabolism
Flavobacterium psychrophilum has a strictly aerobic metabolism, but is unable to use carbohydrates as a source of carbon and energy.  Instead, it relies on peptides for carbon and energy.  Secreted proteases result in a mixture of amino acids and oligopeptides that comprise the main source of carbon, nitrogen, and energy.  Peptidases degrade imported peptides to amino acids, which are then processed by amino acids catabolic pathways.  The degradation of lipids to fatty acids is achieved by a phospholipase and by three enzymes of the esterase-lipase-thioesterase family.  Beta-oxidation of fatty acids is performed by a long-chain fatty acid-CoA ligase, three fatty acid dehydrogenases, a crotonase and three thiolases.  Most of the degradation products of host proteins and lipids by the F. psychrophilum are available as citric acid cycle precursors.

Phylogeny
Because of its yellow pigmentation, Flavobacterium psychrophilum was originally believed to be a myxobacterium.  However, its inability to produce fruiting bodies or degrade complex polysaccharides considered this classification inappropriate and was then suggested to belong within the genus Flexibacter. The low G+C composition of the DNA of F. psychrophilum was inconsistent with the high G+C content of Flexibacter species.  Its DNA G+C demonstrated that it was more closely associated with those of Flavobacterium species.   Analysis of the 16S rRNA gene indicated that F. psychrophilum, F.columnare, and F. maritimus were closely related and probably shared a common descent.

Genome
The genome of Flavobacterium psychrophilum consists of a circular chromosome of 2,861,988 bp, which is predicted to contain 2,432 protein-coding genes.  Compared to environmental members of the family, it has a small genome probably related to its restricted ecological niche. The genome encodes 13 assumed secreted proteases that are involved in virulence and destruction of the host's tissues. Also, the genome encodes for bacterial hemolysins that cooperate with proteases for tissue destruction and thiol-activated cytolysins like proteins that are responsible for host tissue damage.

The genome of the organism encodes for an extensive aerobic respiratory chain.  Genome analysis revealed that sugar kinase and phosphotransferase systems used by bacteria for specific carbohydrate uptake are absent.  However, genes encoding for enzymes for the glycolytic pathway and the pentose phosphate pathway are present in its genome.  These two pathways are therefore involved in precursor metabolites. Gene FP1110 and FP1111 encode for cyanophycinase and cyanophycin synthetase may serve as a storage compound for carbon, nitrogen, and energy and allowing the organism to survive in low-nutrient conditions.

Bacterial Coldwater Disease (BCWD)
Flavobacterium psychrophilum is the causative agent of Bacterial coldwater disease (BCWD).  Affected fish first display a whitish discoloration along the exterior side of the adipose fin then eventually progresses to invest the entire caudal peduncle.4 Infection can occur horizontally, between fish via waterborne and contact exposure, and vertically, because its association with early life stages of the fish.   F. psychrophilum is able to resist lysozyme concentration greater than those that occur within salmoid eggs, making vertical transmission possible.  Treatment for BCWD is possible in early stages.  Bath treatments with either water-soluble oxytetracyline or quaternary ammonium compounds are recommended, but such treatments are ineffective once the erosion of the peduncle and caudal fin become evident. In Europe, treatment has been successful with the use of oxytetracyline, amoxicillin, and florfenicol with little antibiotic resistance forming in the bacteria. Currently, there are no commercially licensed vaccines available for use against this pathogen.

References

External links
Type strain of Flavobacterium psychrophilum at BacDive -  the Bacterial Diversity Metadatabase

Bacteria described in 1989
Psychrophiles
Bacterial diseases of fish
psychrophilum